(1564–1651) was a Japanese samurai daimyō of the late Sengoku and early Edo periods.

Daimyō
The son of Mizuno Tadashige, he served Sassa Narimasa in his younger years.  He fought for Narimasa in Toyotomi Hideyoshi's Kyūshū Campaign in 1587.

He was a leader fighting with the Tokugawa forces (the eastern army) at the Siege of Osaka.  In 1615, the shogunate moved his fief from Kariya Domain in Mikawa Province to Kōriyama Domain in Yamato Province (60,000 koku); then in 1619, his fief was transferred to Fukuyama Domain in Bingo Province (100,000 koku).  In 1638, he led forces in the shogunate army which put down the Shimabara Rebellion in Kyushu.

Death
In 1651, he died at Fukuyama Castle at the age of 88.  His remains were interred at Kenchu-ji, the Mizuno family temple near Fukuyama Castle.

The line of his direct descendants ended in 1698. In 1919, Katsunari was posthumously elevated to the lower third rank of the Imperial Court.

References

Samurai
Daimyo
1564 births
1651 deaths
Mizuno clan
Deified Japanese people